was a town located in Nishitonami District, Toyama Prefecture, Japan.

On November 1, 2005, Fukuoka was merged into the expanded city of Takaoka.

As of 2003, the town has an estimated population of 13,623 and a density of 231.84 persons per km². The total area is 58.76 km².

The town festival was called Tsukurimon and featured carvings and dioramas made from produce.

Fukuoka was home to Kameo Corporation, the designers of the "Boyfriend's Arm Pillow".

External links
Takaoka official website 
MSNC News Story featuring Arm Pillow

Dissolved municipalities of Toyama Prefecture
Takaoka, Toyama